Machas la parmesana or “Parmesan machas” is a dish made with the macha. This is a saltwater clam, a bivalve that is native to Chile used by ancient marine culture. This bivalve is known scientifically as Mesodesma donacium and in English is called either the pink clam, or the surf clam. The dish also includes Parmesan cheese.

History 

This classic of Chilean cuisine was created more than 50 years ago in Viña del Mar by the Italian immigrants Edoardo Melotti Ferrari and Adelfo Garuti at the Italian restaurant San Marco. There is no previous record of the dish before the 1950s.
 
The dish is popular along the coast of Chile, where the macha can be found in great numbers. It is prepared with the meat of the macha in one half of the shell, covered in Parmesan cheese, a little butter and seasoned with white wine or a drop of lemon, and then baked for a few minutes.

Variations
There are several variations of this dish: the same ingredients can be combined in an earthenware paila; the Parmesan can be replaced with the Chilean cheese queso mantecoso; it can be prepared with cream added or with sliced garlic added; and it can be made using other types of clams rather than machas.

See also 
 Chilean cuisine
 Immigration to Chile
 Chilean Culture

References

External links 
Chilean food

Chilean cuisine
Seafood dishes